Trona stercoraria, common name the rat cowry or droppings cowry, is a species of sea snail, a cowry, a marine gastropod mollusk in the family Cypraeidae, the cowries.

Description
They are very variable in pattern and colour. The shape ranges from oval to rhomboidal. The surface is smooth and shiny, the basic color is bluish, greenish or greyish, but it can be completely dark brown or whitish. Normally there is a dense dark brown spotting on the dorsum. The wide margins are usually dark brown and the anterior and posterior canals end into well developed 'rostra'. The base may be purplish, light brown, pinkish or white, with a long and narrow aperture and long brown, beige or white fine teeth with brown spacing. The 'fossula' is considerably protruding.

Distribution
Trona stercoraria occurs in west Africa along Cape Verdes, Senegal, Guinea, Cameroon, Gabon, São Tomé Island, the Congo and Angola.

Habitat
These cowries usually live in shallow waters under large rocks.

Subspecies 
 Trona stercoraria stercoraria (Linnaeus, 1758)  (synonyms : Cypraea conspurcata Gmelin, J.F., 1791; Cypraea fasciata Gmelin, J.F., 1791; Cypraea gibba Gmelin, J.F., 1791; Cypraea ligata Röding, P.F., 1798; Trona cineracea Sulliotti, G.R., 1924)
 Trona stercoraria minima  (Linnaeus, C., 1758) 
 Trona stercoraria var. rattus (Lamarck, 1810): accepted as Trona stercoraria (Linnaeus, 1758)
 Trona stercoraria var. tumulosa (Meuschen, 1778) accepted as Trona stercoraria (Linnaeus, 1758)

References

 Meuschen, F.C. (1778). Mvsevm Gronovianvm. Sive Index Rervm Natvralivm tam Mammalivm Amphibiorvm Piscivm Insectorvm Conchyliorvm Zoophytorvm Plantarvm et Mineralivm exqvisitissimorvm qvam Arte factarvm nonnvllarvm. Inter qvae eminet Herbarivs siccvs Plantarvm a Tovrnefortio Claitonio Linnaeo aliisqve Botanicis collectarvm. Qvae omnia mvlta Cvra et magnis Svmptibvs sibi comparavit Vir amplissimvs & celeberrimvs Lavr. Theod. Gronovivs J.V.D. Civitatis Lvgdvno Batavae Senator et Scabinvs Societatis Regiae Londinensis Basilaeensis et Hollandiae qvae Harlemi est aliorvmque Socivs &c. &c. Th. Haak & Socios J. Meerburg, Lvgdvni Batavorvm, vi + 251
 Bernard, P.A. (Ed.) (1984). Coquillages du Gabon [Shells of Gabon]. Pierre A. Bernard: Libreville, Gabon. 140, 75 plates pp. 
 Lorenz & Hubert (2000). A guide to worldwide cowries. ConchBooks 1-584 page(s): 52 
 Burgess, C.M. (1985) Cowries of the World. Gordon verhoef, Seacomber Publications, South Africa, Cape Town. XIV + 289 pp. page(s): 111

External links
 Linnaeus, C. (1758). Systema Naturae per regna tria naturae, secundum classes, ordines, genera, species, cum characteribus, differentiis, synonymis, locis. Editio decima, reformata [10th revised edition, vol. 1: 824 pp. Laurentius Salvius: Holmiae]
 Blainville, H. M. D. de. (1824). Mollusques, Mollusca (Malacoz.), pp. 1-392. In: Dictionnaire des Sciences Naturelles (F. Cuvier, ed.), vol. 32. Levrault, Strasbourg et Paris, & Le Normant, Paris
 Gmelin, J. F. (1791). Vermes. In: Gmelin J.F. (Ed.) Caroli a Linnaei Systema Naturae per Regna Tria Naturae, Ed. 13. Tome 1(6). G.E. Beer, Lipsiae
  Lamarck (J.-B. M. de). (1810). Sur la détermination des espèces parmi les animaux sans vertèbres, et particulièrement parmi les Mollusques testacés. Annales du Muséum d'Histoire Naturelle. 15: 20-40
 Gastropods
 Biolib

Cypraeidae
Gastropods described in 1758
Taxa named by Carl Linnaeus
Molluscs of the Atlantic Ocean
Marine molluscs of Africa
Gastropods of Cape Verde
Invertebrates of West Africa